Samuel Thaw Walton (January 3, 1943 – May 9, 2002) was an American football tackle who played three seasons  with the New York Jets and Houston Oilers. He was drafted by the Jets in the third round of the 1968 NFL Draft. Walton played college football at East Texas State University and attended Melrose High School in Memphis, Tennessee. He was a member of the New York Jets team that won Super Bowl III.

After his football career ended Walton became homeless on the streets of Memphis, Tennessee and died of a heart attack in 2002. His teammates had attempted to help him but were unsuccessful.

References

External links
Just Sports Stats
Fanbase profile

1943 births
2002 deaths
Players of American football from Memphis, Tennessee
American football offensive tackles
African-American players of American football
Texas A&M–Commerce Lions football players
New York Jets players
Houston Oilers players
20th-century African-American sportspeople
21st-century African-American people